This is the discography of British singer-songwriter Hazel O'Connor.

Albums

Studio albums

Soundtrack albums

Live albums

Compilation albums

EPs

Singles

As featured artist

References

Discographies of British artists
Pop music discographies
Rock music discographies
New wave discographies